Stuart John Wilkin (born 12 March 1998) is a professional footballer who plays as a midfielder for Sabah. Born in England, he represents the Malaysian national team.

Youth Career
As a youth player, Wilkin joined the youth academy of English Premier League side Southampton. In 2016, he joined the Missouri State Bears in the United States.

Club career

Metropolitan Police 
On 2019, Wilkin signed a one-year deal with a Southern Premier South side Metropolitan Police. He made 4 appearance with the team and scored 1 goal.

Johor Darul Ta'zim II 
Before the 2021 season, he signed for Malaysian second tier club JDT II.

On loan to Sabah 
Before the 2022 season, Wilkin was sent on loan to Sabah (Malaysia) in the Malaysian top flight. On 4 March 2022, he debuted for Sabah during a 0–1 loss to Negeri Sembilan. For the 2022 Malaysia Super League season, he made 18 appearances  and scored 2 goals with the team.

Sabah 
On 1st December 2022, Wilkin signed a permanent deal for the Malaysia Super League side Sabah with a two-year contract. He joined the team from JDT.

International career
In November 2022, Wilkin earned his first call-up to the Malaysia squad for their training camp ahead of the 2022 AFF Championship. On 9 December 2022, he made his debut against Cambodia national football team and scored his first goal in the match.

International goals

Personal life
Born in England, Wilkin is of mixed English and Malaysian descent.

References

External links
 

1998 births
Sportspeople from Woking
Footballers from Surrey
Malaysian footballers
Malaysia international footballers
English footballers
Malaysian people of English descent
English people of Malaysian descent
Association football midfielders
English expatriate sportspeople in Malaysia
English expatriate sportspeople in the United States
Expatriate footballers in Malaysia
Expatriate soccer players in the United States
Johor Darul Ta'zim II F.C. players
Living people
Malaysia Premier League players
Malaysia Super League players
Missouri State Bears soccer players
Sabah F.C. (Malaysia) players
English expatriate footballers